The 2018–19 FA Women's National League is the 27th season of the competition, and the first since a restructure and rebranding of the top four tiers of English football by The Football Association. Began in 1992, it was previously known as the FA Women's Premier League. It sits at the third and fourth levels of the women's football pyramid, below the FA Women's Championship and above the eight regional football leagues.

The league features six regional divisions: the Northern and Southern divisions at level three of the pyramid, and below those Division One North, Division One Midlands, Division One South East, and Division One South West. The league normally consists of 72 teams, divided equally into six divisions of twelve teams. After two resignations from and one late promotion to the FA Women's Championship, and one withdrawal from Division One, the league started the 2018–19 season with 13 teams in the Northern Division but only 11 in Division One Midlands. At the end of the season the champions of the Northern and Southern divisions will both qualify for a Championship Play Off match against each other which will decide the overall National League Champion. Subject to meeting league requirements both teams will be promoted to the FA Women's Championship. As part of the Football Association's restructure, clubs from the FA Women's Super League and FA Women's Championship were able to enter teams into the Reserve Section.

Premier Division

Northern Division

Changes from last season:
Leicester City Women was awarded a FA Women's Championship licence through application.
Sunderland was demoted from the FA WSL 1 after failing to retain a licence in the top 2 tiers.
Doncaster Rovers Belles and Sheffield withdrew from the FA Women's Championship before the season started after initially successfully retaining a Tier 2 licence.
West Bromwich Albion and Wolverhampton Wanderers were relegated to Division One Midlands.
Hull City were promoted into the Northern Division from Northern Division One.

League table

Results

Southern Division

Changes from last season:
League champions Charlton Athletic was promoted to FA Women's Championship.
West Ham United was awarded a FA Women's Super League licence through application.
Lewes was awarded a FA Women's Championship licence through application.
Crystal Palace was awarded a FA Women's Championship licence through application after the withdrawal of Sheffield during the closed season.
Oxford United and Watford were relegated from the FA WSL 2 after failing to retain a licence for Tier 2.
Loughborough Foxes, Plymouth Argyle and Milton Keynes Dons were promoted into the Southern Division from Midlands Division One, South West Division One and South East Division One respectively.
Swindon Town was relegated to Division One South West.

League table

Results

Championship play-off
The overall FA WNL champion will be decided by a play-off match to be held at the end of the season. Both sides will also earn promotion to the FA Women's Championship subject to meeting licensing requirements.

Division One

Division One North

Changes from last season:
Hull City was promoted to the Northern Division.
Norton & Stockton Ancients was promoted from the North East Regional League.
Burnley was promoted from the North West Regional League.
Mossley Hill was relegated to the regional leagues.

League table

Results

Division One Midlands

Changes from last season:
Loughborough Foxes was promoted to the Southern Division.
Sheffield United was awarded a FA Women's Championship licence through application.
West Bromwich Albion and Wolverhampton Wanderers were relegated from the Northern Division.
Bedworth United was promoted from the West Midlands Regional League.
Nettleham was promoted from the East Midlands Regional League.
Leicester City Ladies and Rotherham United were relegated to the regional leagues.
Radcliffe Olympic withdrew from the league before the season started.

League table

Results

Division One South East

Changes from last season:
Milton Keynes Dons was promoted to the Southern Division.
Billericay Town was promoted from the Eastern Region League.
Crawley Wasps was promoted from the London & South East Regional League.
Haringey Borough was relegated to the regional leagues.

League table

Results

Division One South West

Changes from last season:
Plymouth Argyle was promoted to the Southern Division.
Swindon Town was relegated from the Southern Division.
Chesham United was promoted from the Southern Region League.
Buckland Athletic was promoted from the South West Regional League.
Basingstoke withdrew from the league during the 2017–18 season.

 St Nicholas withdrew from the league after the first weekend without playing a match due to a lack of numbers.

League table

Results

Reserve Division

Reserve Northern Division One

Sheffield and Sunderland withdrew their entries before the season started.
Hull City was moved from Reserve Northern Division Two to Reserve Northern Division One before the season started after the withdrawal of Sheffield and Sunderland.
Bradford City withdrew from the league during winter 2018–19. All results involving Bradford City were expunged.

League table

Results

Reserve Northern Division Two

Bolton Wanderers withdrew their entry at the start of the season.
Hull City was moved to Reserve Northern Division Two to Reserve Northern Division One before the season started after the withdrawal of Sheffield and Sunderland.
Fylde Ladies withdrew from the league during winter 2018–19. All results involving Fylde Ladies were expunged.

League table

Results

Reserve Midland Division

The New Saints withdrew their entry before the season started.

League table

Results

Reserve South/South East Division

 West Ham United withdrew their entry at the start of the season.
 Ipswich Town withdrew from the league during autumn 2018. All results involving Ipswich Town were expunged.

League table

Results

Reserve South/South West Division

 Poole Town withdrew from the league during autumn 2018. All results involving Poole Town were expunged.

League table

Results

References

External links
Official website of the FA Women's National League
League results and standings

FA Women's National League seasons
2018–19 in English women's football
2018–19 domestic women's association football leagues